George Blenkinsop (1822 – 2 June 1904) was a Hudson's Bay Company employee who made important contributions to Canadian history as a pioneer in the British Columbia area of the country.

References 
 

1822 births
1904 deaths
Businesspeople from British Columbia
Hudson's Bay Company people